This article lists events that occurred during 1929 in Estonia.

Incumbents

Events
Economic Depression in Estonia.

Births
23 February – Jaan Einasto, Estonian astrophysicist
21 July – Asta Vihandi, opera singer and actress (died 1993)

Deaths

References

 
1920s in Estonia
Estonia
Estonia
Years of the 20th century in Estonia